Karikan (also Romanized as Karīkān; also known as Garīkān) is a village in Shepiran Rural District, Kuhsar District, Salmas County, West Azerbaijan Province, Iran. At the 2006 census, its population was 782, in 128 families.

References 

Populated places in Salmas County